Emilio Insolera (born 29 January 1979) is an actor and producer, known for Sign Gene: The First Deaf Superheroes (2017). In 2022, Insolera had a role in Simon Kinberg's The 355.

Early life and education
Emilio Insolera was born on 29 January 1979 in Buenos Aires, Argentina, into an Italian Deaf family, the youngest son of automotive toolmaker Alfio Insolera and bank employee Maria Cristina Drovetta Insolera. Following the rampant hyperinflation in 1989, Insolera’s family moved back to Italy, first to Sicily later to various cities frequently, eventually setting in Rome. Upon completing high school, Insolera moved to New York City.

Insolera developed an interest in acting and filmmaking since kid: there was no access to closed captions on TV, he recalls “our imagination filled the void of the dialogues that took place” so his parents would regularly bring him to movie theaters or rent VHS movies since these were in original language and therefore subtitled.

As a Fulbright and Roberto Wirth scholar, he received his bachelor's degree in Film and Sign Language Linguistics from  Gallaudet University, Washington, D.C., the only liberal arts college for the deaf in the world, and his master's degree in Mass Communication with summa cum laude, from University of Rome La Sapienza.   Insolera speaks and reads lips fluently even though sign language is his native language. He has an older brother, Humberto, himself deaf too.

Career

After freelancing for various indie houses and working for MTV in New York City, Insolera wrote, directed and produced the long feature superhero film Sign Gene: The First Deaf Superheroes. The film, shot between Japan, the US and Italy, centers on deaf superheroes who have the ability to create superhuman powers through the use of sign language. “Creatively, it all started with Japan,” Insolera tells The Japan Times. “My first impression was that I had stumbled into the future, but as a linguist I was also instantly fascinated with Japanese and how it has a relationship with sign language. Kanji are usually concepts or ideas and then hiragana acts as a bridge for communication. It’s the same with sign language: we use fingerspelling (spelling out the alphabet with your hands) between our conceptual signs.” 

The characters are blessed with arcane powers "like those, when signing with finger guns, hands actually metamorphose into bona fide weapons, replete with spewing fire and all sorts; or where, when signing the word 'close', of being able to make doors close at will."

Influenced by films such as Ridley Scott’s Blade Runner (1982) and Black Rain (1989), as well as the animated 1988 film Akira, Insolera originally planned to make a short film but it garnered such a groundswell of interest with people offering to become involved, that Insolera, upon realizing it had the legs for a shot at the big time, had to rewrite the script into a feature-length. The casting came by way of word of mouth: Insolera was especially looking for native signers fluent in Sign language.

The film had its world premiere on 8 September 2017 in Milan, was released in theatres by UCI Cinemas on 14 September 2017, had its US debut on 13 April 2018 and was released in Japan on 14 September 2018. 
The film was also presented at the Italian Pavilion, Hôtel Barrière Le Majestic during the 71st Cannes Film Festival.

Sign Gene: The First Deaf Superheroes  received positive reviews from critics. On Los Angeles Times, Michael Rechtshaffen describes the “fresh, unique filmmaking voice” as a “fast-paced potpourri of stock footage combined with sign-language and stroboscopic action sequences performed by a deaf cast, video effects simulating grainy, scratchy film stock and that aforementioned all-enveloping sound mix, with an end result that proves as wildly inventive as it is empowering”. On Avvenire it reads the film “will mostly like to the younger generation accustomed to the rapid and psychedelic language of video games or Japanese cartoons”. Writing for ASVOFF, Giorgia Cantarini says the story is intricate  and “very fascinating. The sounds create an unexpected important part, sometimes overwhelming who is watching. All happens very fast and astonishes you with a vibrant energy”. On Corriere della Sera, Michela Trigari calls Sign Gene a film that uses the science fiction as a medium to capture the imagination and “make visible what is invisible to the eyes”. The film is making waves, and has inspired Elena Pizzuto, an Italian linguist, to declare it “the symbol of activism for the visual community ” and Paul Dakin, from Hektoen International, an “unlikely cult classic”.

In November 2018, Insolera appeared on the cover of Tokyo Weekender taken by worldwide known photographer Leslie Kee and was featured on the main poster of the same photographer’s 20th anniversary photo exhibition “WE ARE LOVE” in Ginza, Tokyo.

In January, Insolera was featured in a full pages fashion story on Vanity Fair Italia with Carola Insolera taken by Rosi Di Stefano.

In September 2019 it was announced that Insolera had joined the Simon Kinberg espionage The 355 alongside Jessica Chastain, Penélope Cruz, Diane Kruger, Lupita Nyongo, Bingbing Fan, Edgar Ramirez and Sebastian Stan. The film was released by Universal Pictures in 2022. Academy Award Winner for Best Actress Jessica Chastain helped Insolera get an audition with Simon Kinberg and he landed the role of Giovanni Lupo, a hacker. The character “is the type of person who, like many deaf people in real life, was able to reach a very high level on his own. It's not explained in the movie but perhaps thanks to his deafness, Lupo may have had higher communication barriers and isolated himself to connect with technology to a great extent. Technology became his best friend”, he commented.

Personal life

He is in relationship with Norwegian model Carola Insolera, whom he met while in Tokyo and has two daughters.

Activism
Insolera collaborated with LISMedia and Mason Perkins Deafness Fund to the realization of various media resources in sign language. Along with researchers Elena Radutzky and Mauro Mottinelli, Insolera produced the first Italian Sign Language dictionary in digital format.

Starting from January 2019, Insolera collaborates with Striscia la notizia, an Italian satirical television program on the Mediaset controlled Canale 5 on the production of various shows. Striscia la notizia was ranked the most viewed television program of the spring season 2019 by Auditel.

Filmography

Film

Television

Music video
 (2014) "Flash" song written by Maria Eva Albistur's Santa Fe – featuring Insolera

References

External links

 
 
 
 

Deaf film directors
Living people
Male actors from Buenos Aires
Male deaf actors
Deaf writers
Deaf activists
Deaf culture
Gallaudet University alumni
21st-century Italian male actors
Male actors from New York City 
Italian male film actors
American male deaf actors
American male film actors
21st-century American male actors
American deaf people
Hispanic and Latino American male actors
Hispanic and Latino American actors 
Italian deaf people
1979 births
Fulbright alumni